Shmueli Ungar  is an American singer, songwriter and entertainer in the contemporary Jewish religious music industry. He was originally part of Shira Choir, but eventually left the group to progress his career as a solo artist. He has since released four albums, three of which charted on the Billboard World Music category.

Discography
Shmueli 2 (2016)
Mach a Bracha (2018)
On Stage (2019)
Madraigos (2020)
Back Stage (2022)

Singles
Yishoma (2016), debut single
Rachamana (2016)
Mach a Bracha (2018), music video/opening song to Mach a Bracha album
The Dreidel Song (2019)
Kol Hamelamed (2020), produced by Chasdei Lev
Halailah Hazeh (2020), featuring Hershy Weinberger
Tata Mama (2022)
D'Tzach (2022), featuring Hershy Weinberger
Chasdi Hasem (2022)

Collaborations and appearances
Mulei Simcha (2017), album produced by Naftali Schnitzler featuring seven vocalists including Ungar
Bracha and Nachas (2018), together with Yiddish Nachas (produced by Moshy Kraus)
Kilunee (2019), appearance on Fingerprints (album by Sruly Bodansky/Naftali Schnitzler)
Simi Lev (2019), appearance on Lev el Haneshama (album by R' Chezkie Weisz/Naftali Schnitzler)
The Plus Factor (2019) and The Plus Factor, Episode 2 (2020), music videos my Yeedle Kahan, featuring Ungar and other singers
Bitchu Bashem (2020), together with Sababa Band
Bar Ilu (2020), single, together with Ohad Moskowitz
Halev Sheli (2021), together with Sababa Band
Lchaim and Nachas (2021), together with Yaakov Shwekey
D'Tzach (2022), with Hershy Weinberger, featuring  Yoeli Klein, Shaya Gross and Naftali Schnitzler
Lev Chodosh (2023), together with Baruch Levine

References 
 Shmueli Ungar Official site

Living people
American Orthodox Jews
Jewish American musicians
Jewish songwriters
Hasidic singers
Hasidic entertainers
Year of birth missing (living people)
Orthodox pop musicians